A by-election was held for the New South Wales Legislative Assembly seat of South Coast on 14 November 1942. It was triggered by the death of Rupert Beale.

Dates

Candidates
Henry Bate was the former member for South Coast, who had been defeated by Rupert Beale by 39 votes at the 1941 election.
Jack Beale was the son of Rupert, and was an engineer on munition works with the New South Wales Department of Public Works.

Result 

Rupert Beale died.

Aftermath
Jack Beale would go on to hold the seat for 30 years, as an Independent until 1948 when he joined the s.

See also
Electoral results for the district of South Coast
List of New South Wales state by-elections

References 

1942 elections in Australia
New South Wales state by-elections
1940s in New South Wales